The Hypopterygiaceae are a family of mainly tropical mosses of the order Hypopterygiales, a sister-group to the Hookeriales and Hypnales.

It contains eight genera.

Arbusculohypopterygium  
Canalohypopterygium 
Catharomnion 
Cyathophorum 
Dendrocyathophorum  
Dendrohypopterygium  
Hypopterygium 
Lopidium

References

External links

 Bryophyte Phylogeny Poster

Moss families
Bryopsida